"Loser" is a song by American rock band 3 Doors Down. It was released on June 26, 2000, as the second single from their debut album, The Better Life (2000). The song spent 21 weeks at the number-one position on the US Billboard Mainstream Rock Tracks, an all-time record for the chart. It additionally peaked at number four on the Canadian RPM Rock Report and rose to number five in Portugal in April 2003.

Content
According to lead lyricist Brad Arnold, the song is written from the perspective of a childhood friend of his who became addicted to cocaine. The lyrics contain multiple allusions to suicide.

Release and reception

Commercial performance
Released to American mainstream rock and active rock radio on June 26, 2000, "Loser" debuted on the US Billboard Hot 100 at number 76 on the chart dated October 21, 2000. It spent 20 weeks on this chart, peaking at number 55 on December 2 of the same year. On the Billboard Mainstream Rock Tracks chart, the song spent 21 weeks at number one (from September 9, 2000, to January 27, 2001), becoming the chart's longest-running number one hit, and it is among the songs that spent the most weeks on the listing, remaining on the chart for 53 weeks. In addition, it reached number two on the Billboard Modern Rock Tracks chart and number 36 on the Adult Top 40. The Recording Industry Association of America awarded the record a gold disc on February 26, 2020, for sales and streams of over 500,000. In Canada, it peaked at number four on the RPM Top 30 Rock Report in September 2000.

Beginning in early 2001, "Loser" began to chart in other countries outside North America. In Germany, it debuted at number 99 on January 8, rose to its peak of number 78 the following week, then spent three more weeks on the Media Control chart before falling off. It spent three weeks on the Dutch Single Top 100 in February, peaking at number 67 during its second week in. In neighboring Belgium, the track appeared on Flanders' Ultratip Bubbling Under listing, peaking at number nine on March 10. Later the same month, it debuted at number 42 on the New Zealand Singles Chart and rose to number 37, its peak, on April 1. On the Australian Singles Chart, the song topped off at number 68 on May 7. "Loser" experienced withstanding popularity in Portugal, not reaching the top 10 until April 2003, when it climbed to number five on the AFP ranking.

Brad Arnold's response
When 3 Doors Down lead singer Brad Arnold discovered that "Loser" had topped the Billboard Mainstream Rock Tracks chart for 21 weeks, he was initially indifferent, explaining that they were still focusing on the success of their previous single, "Kryptonite". He said that although "Loser" was virtually ignored, it was the band's deal-maker along with "Duck and Run" and "Be Like That"; however, Arnold has stated that if "Loser" did not become a hit, neither would have the succeeding two singles.

Music video
The music video, directed by Liz Friedlander, features the band performing the song in a dimly lit high school. According to Arnold, the video shoot took place in California.

Live performances
"Loser" was first performed live on January 15, 1997, in Pascagoula, Mississippi. As of April 1, 2019, it has been performed 466 times, making it the second most performed song by 3 Doors Down.

Track listings

European CD single
 "Loser" (Top40 radio edit) – 3:50
 "Loser" (live version) – 5:38

European and Australian maxi-CD single
 "Loser" (album version) – 4:21
 "Loser" (acoustic, Radio Fritz, Berlin) – 3:59
 "Loser" (live version) – 5:38
 "Kryptonite" (acoustic version) – 3:49

Australian maxi-CD single 2
 "Loser" (album version)
 "Kryptonite" (acoustic version)
 "Wasted Me"
 "By My Side" (live)
 "So I Need You" (live)
 "Kryptonite" (video)
 "Loser" (video)

Credits and personnel
Credits are lifted from the European CD single liner notes.

Studio
 Recorded at Ardent Studios (Memphis, Tennessee)

Personnel
 Brad Arnold – writing
 Matt Roberts – writing
 Todd Harrell – writing
 Paul Ebersold – production, recording
 Matt Martone – recording
 Toby Wright – mixing

Charts

Certifications

Release history

References

2000 singles
2000 songs
3 Doors Down songs
Music videos directed by Liz Friedlander
Republic Records singles
Songs written by Brad Arnold
Songs written by Matt Roberts (musician)
Songs written by Todd Harrell
Songs about suicide
Songs about cocaine
Songs about heartache